The 2014–15 Maltese First Division (referred to as the BOV First Division due to sponsorship reasons) began on 12 September 2014 and finished with a play-off match on 3 May 2015.

Teams 
The following teams have changed division since the 2013–14 season.

To First Division 

Promoted from Maltese Second Division
 Mqabba
 Pembroke Athleta
 Fgura United

Relegated from Maltese Premier League
 Vittoriosa Stars
 Rabat Ajax

From First Division 

Relegated to Maltese Second Division
 Ħamrun Spartans
 Żejtun Corinthians

Promoted to Maltese Premier League
 Pietà Hotspurs
 Żebbuġ Rangers

League table

Results 

Each team plays every other team in the league home-and-away for a total of 26 matches played each.

Play-off 

Due to a tie for third place between Melita and Gżira United, a play-off match was played to determine which team would participate in the promotion play-off against the tenth-placed team from the Premier League. The match was played on 3 May 2015.

Top scorers

References

External links 
 First Division on Malta Football Association

Maltese First Division seasons
Mal
2